Nanarchy is the second studio album by Black Rain, released on October 15, 1996, by Fifth Colvmn Records.

Reception 
Aiding & Abetting said "meandering through the experimental electronic universe, Black Rain makes many stops but never really puts down roots." Sonic Boom said the album "is much like its predecessor in that it was written primarily as a soundtrack style album" and "however upon further examination one notices a number of departures from their debut album."

Track listing

Personnel 
Adapted from the Nanarchy liner notes.

Black Rain
 Stuart Argabright – instruments, production
 Shinichi Shimokawa – instruments, production

Production and design
 Scott Anthony – recording
 Joseph Bartoldus – recording
 Zalman Fishman – executive-production
 Fred Szymanski – recording

Release history

References

External links 
 
 Nanarchy at Discogs (list of releases)
 Nanarchy at iTunes

1996 albums
Black Rain (band) albums
Fifth Colvmn Records albums